John Norton (died 1462) was a medieval churchman and university Chancellor.

Norton was a Doctor of Canon Law and a Fellow of New College, Oxford, from 1404 until 1421, when he left to join the Court of Arches. In 1433, he became the vicar-general of Salisbury. He joined the Bishop of Durham, Robert Neville, as Chancellor in Durham. He was Chancellor of the University of Oxford during 1439–40. In 1440, he became the vicar-general of York.

References

Year of birth unknown
1462 deaths
Fellows of New College, Oxford
Chancellors of the University of Oxford
15th-century English people
15th-century English clergy